Senator Harrison may refer to:

Members of the United States Senate
Benjamin Harrison (1833–1901), U.S. Senator from Indiana from 1881 to 1887
Pat Harrison (1881–1941), U.S. Senator from Mississippi 1919 to 1941
William Henry Harrison (1773–1841), U.S. Senator from Ohio from 1825 to 1828

United States state senate members
Albertis Harrison (1907–1995), Virginia State Senate
Burr Harrison (1904–1973), Virginia State Senate
George Paul Harrison Jr. (1841–1922), Alabama State Senate
Henry Baldwin Harrison (1821–1901), Connecticut State Senate
Peachy Harrison (1777–1848), Virginia State Senate
Richard A. Harrison (1824–1904), Ohio State Senate
Russell Benjamin Harrison (1854–1936), Indiana
Steve Harrison (politician) (born 1966), West Virginia State Senate
Thomas W. Harrison (1856–1935), Virginia State Senate